Parkside East Historic District is a national historic district located at Buffalo in Erie County, New York.  The district is architecturally and historically significant for its association with the 1876 Parks and Parkways Plan for the city of Buffalo developed by Frederick Law Olmsted.  It consists of 1,769 contributing structures (1,109 principal buildings, 659 outbuildings) developed from 1876 to 1936, as a middle class residential neighborhood.  The district largely contains single-family dwellings, built in a variety of popular architectural styles, and located along the irregular and curvilinear street pattern developed by Olmsted.  The district is located to the east of Buffalo's Delaware Park and includes the Walter V. Davidson House and the separately listed Darwin D. Martin House, both designed by Frank Lloyd Wright.

It was listed on the National Register of Historic Places in 1986.

References

External links
Official Site for the Parkside Community Association

Historic districts in Buffalo, New York
Prairie School architecture in New York (state)
Colonial Revival architecture in New York (state)
Geography of Buffalo, New York
Historic districts on the National Register of Historic Places in New York (state)
National Register of Historic Places in Buffalo, New York